The Municipality of Beltinci is a municipality in the Prekmurje region of northeastern Slovenia. Its seat is the settlement of Beltinci. The municipality has 8,256 inhabitants. It was a sanjak under the name Balatin that initially belonged to the Budin Eyalet, and later the Kanije Eyalet, during Ottoman rule before the Treaty of Karlowitz.

Settlements
In addition to the municipal seat of Beltinci, the municipality also includes the following settlements:
 Bratonci
 Dokležovje
 Gančani
 Ižakovci
 Lipa
 Lipovci
 Melinci

References

External links

 Municipality of Beltinci on Geopedia
 Beltinci municipal site 

 
Beltinci
1994 establishments in Slovenia